Polyana is a rural locality (a selo) in Rusanovskoye Rural Settlement, Ternovsky District, Voronezh Oblast, Russia. The population was 458 as of 2010. There are 13 streets.

Geography 
Polyana is located 15 km northwest of Ternovka (the district's administrative centre) by road. Rusanovo is the nearest rural locality.

References 

Rural localities in Ternovsky District